The 2013 Campeonato Paranaense de Futebol Profissional da 1ª Divisão was the 98th season of Paraná's top professional football league. The competition began on January 20 and ended on May 12. Coritiba won the championship for the 37th time, while Paranavaí and Nacional were relegated.

Format
The tournament consists of a double round-robin format, in which all twelve teams play each other twice, with classification split in two stages. Each round counts as one stage.

The better-placed teams of each stage will face themselves in a two-legged tie, with the team with the most points in the overall classification playing the second leg home, the winning team will then be declared champion. In case of a tie in number of points and goal balance, the advantage is for the best campaign team. If the same team is best-placed on both stages, it will automatically be declared champion.

The best two-placed teams in the overall classification not advancing to the finals and not from Curitiba will face themselves in a two-legged tie competing for the Torneio do Interior. The team with the most points will play the second leg home. The bottom two teams on overall classification will be relegated.

Participating teams

First round

Results

Second round

Results

Finals

Torneio do Interior finals

 Londrina was declared champion due to better results on the first and second round.

References

Campeonato Paranaense
Paranaense